Sotomayor Island is an island lying just south of the entrance to Unwin Cove, Trinity Peninsula. Named by the Chilean Antarctic Expedition of 1950-51 for Second Lieutenant Victor Sotomayor L., cargo officer of the ship Lientur during the expedition.

See also 
 List of Antarctic and sub-Antarctic islands

Islands of Trinity Peninsula